Sir Thomas Hussey, 2nd Baronet (1639 – 19 December 1706), of Honington, Lincolnshire, was an English Member of Parliament.

He was the eldest surviving son of Thomas Hussey of Honington and was educated privately and at Christ's College, Cambridge (1655). He succeeded his father before 1641 and succeeded his grandfather as 2nd Baronet in 1648. He was appointed High Sheriff of Lincolnshire for 1668–69.

He was elected a Member (MP) of the Parliament of England for Lincoln in 1681 and Lincolnshire in 1685, 1689, 1690 and 1695.

He married Sarah, the daughter of Sir John Langham, 1st Baronet, of Crosby Place, London and Cottesbrooke, Northamptonshire, with whom he had six sons and four daughters.

References

1639 births
1706 deaths
People from South Kesteven District
Baronets in the Baronetage of England
High Sheriffs of Lincolnshire
English MPs 1681
English MPs 1685–1687
English MPs 1689–1690
English MPs 1690–1695
English MPs 1695–1698
Alumni of Christ's College, Cambridge